Richard Lehman may refer to:

 Richard Lehman (CIA officer) (1923–2007)
 Richard H. Lehman (born 1948), California representative
 Richard Lehman (primary care physician), British primary care physician and academic
 Dick Lehman (Richard D. Lehman), American ceramics artist

See also
 Richard Leaman (born 1956), British charity executive and former senior Royal Navy officer